K. Kunju Nair (1889 – 1984) was an Indian actor, singer and music composer in Malayalam cinema. He was the main character in Balan, the first sound film in Malayalam film in history.

Biography
After Balan, Aroor changed his name to K. K. Aroor. There were 23 songs in Balan, all of which composed by Ibrahim and K.K.Aroor and written by Muthukulam Raghavan Pillai. He subsequently acted in Jnanambika. He later joined the Harikatha Kalakshepam drama troupe. In 1973, P. A. Thomas gave him a small role in his film Kudumbini, after which he retired from cinema.

He was married to Pankajakshiyamma, with whom he had a son, Vasudevan. Struggling financially, he worked as a server in a tea shop during the last days of his life. He died in 1984 in Pallai.

Filmography

As an actor
 Balan (1938)
 Gnanambika (1940)
 Kerala Kesari (1951) 
 Jenova (1953)
 Kudumbini (1964)

As a playback singer
Bhaarathathin Ponvilakkaam as Balan (1938)
Athisukhamee Jeevitham as Balan (1938)
Vishaadam Thingum as Jnaanaambika (1940)

As a music composer
All songs are from Balan (1938)
 Bhaarathathin Ponvilakkaam
 Jayajagadeeshwara
 Jaathakadoshathaale
 Raghukula Nayakane
 Ha Sahajasaayoojyame
 Durnnaya Jeevithame
 Athisukhamee Jeevitham
 Aaghoshangalenthu Cheyyaam
 Aadayaabharanaadikondu
 Lokam Anaswarame
 Sree Vaasudeva Parane
 Deenadayaaparane
 Snehame Slaakhyam
 Madanavilolane Naadha
 Maanini Maniyothum
 Chethoharamaam madyapaanamathe
 Parama Guruve
 Shock Shock
 Kaaminimaar
 Maaran Khorasarangal
 Enoodidham Kadhikkanadhikaparibhavam
 Bhakthaparaayana
 Aaha Malsodari

References

External links

 K. K. Aroor at MSI

Male actors from Kerala
Male actors in Malayalam cinema
Indian male film actors
Malayalam playback singers
Date of birth missing
Date of death missing
20th-century Indian male singers
20th-century Indian singers
People from Alappuzha district
Singers from Kerala
20th-century Indian male actors
20th-century Indian composers